New Ground may refer to:

Places
 Cambusdoon New Ground, a cricket ground located in Ayr, Scotland
 New Ground, Norwich, former cricket ground in Norwich, England
 New Ground, Saint Vincent and the Grenadines, a village in Saint Vincent and the Grenadines
 New Ground, Uxbridge Moor, former cricket ground near Uxbridge, England

Other
 "New Ground" (Stargate SG-1), an episode of the science fiction television series Stargate SG-1
 "New Ground" (TNG episode), an episode of the fifth season of Star Trek: The Next Generation
 New Ground (comics), a New Zealand comics anthology magazine published by DMZ Comics
 Newgrounds, an American website that hosts games and cartoons

See also

 New Recreation Ground
 New Windmill Ground